Jonathan Stalling (born June 24, 1975) is an American poet, scholar, editor, translator, professor, and inventor who works at the intersection of English and Chinese. He is the Harold J & Ruth Newman Chair for US-China Issues and co-director of the Institute for US-China Issues, and is Professor of International and Area Studies at the University of Oklahoma. He is also the affiliate English professor at the University of Oklahoma where he serves as the founding curator of the Chinese Literature Translation Archive (CLTA), and as a founding editor of Chinese Literature Today (CLT) journal and as the editor of the CLT (now CLT2) and CLT book series published by the University of Oklahoma Press. He is the creator of the English Jueju poetic form and Directs the Newman Prize for Chinese Literature and Newman Prize for English Jueju.

Early life and education 
The son of artists, Stalling grew up in Eureka Springs, Arkansas during the back-to-the-land movement, and went to Clear Spring School, where he would later return and teach. After graduating from Eureka Springs High School, he went on to study Chinese at the University of Hawaii and Beijing University, after which he graduated summa cum laude from UC Berkeley with a degree in Chinese studies in 1998. He received his first master's degree from the University of Edinburgh in 2000 and his second from SUNY Buffalo, where he held the McNulty Fellowship in Ethnopoetics and later received his PhD in poetics in 2005.

Career 
Stalling became an assistant professor of English Literature at the University of Oklahoma in 2006 where he went on to establish the Chinese Literature Today journal, book series, and the Chinese Literature Translation Archive and Special Collections at Bizzel Memorial Library. Stalling was the first non-Chinese Poet in Residence of Beijing University and Poet in Residence of Hongcun (Huangshan, Anhui, China) in 2015. Stalling joined the Department of International and Area Studies in the College of International Studies at OU in 2019 when he assumed his current position as the Harold & Ruth Newman Chair of US-China Issues, where he Co-Directs the Institute for US-China Issues.

Teaching 
Stalling teaches a variety of undergraduate courses on twentieth-century American poetry, east–west poetics, buddhism and beat literature, and creative writing. His graduate seminars have focused on postmodern poetics, transpacific literature and criticism, and literary and cultural theory. In addition to OU courses, Stalling organizes a statewide poetry project that teaches classical Chinese poetic forms  in English to K-14 students in Oklahoma Newman Young Writers Award. Stalling has taught courses on Second Language Acquisition and is the creator of new methods for teaching English pronunciation in Chinese language environments.

Poetry 
Stalling is the author of three book-length collections of poetry: Grotto Heaven (Chax),  Yingelishi: Sinophonic Poetry and Poetics (Counterpath), and Lost Wax: Translation through the Void (Tinfish). His opera Yingelishi (吟歌丽诗) was performed at Yunnan University in 2010, and a new version of the work is currently in production in collaboration with the composer Yan Yiguo.

Curation 
The Chinese Literature Translation Archive houses over 14,000 volumes from the Arthur Waley and Howard Goldblatt personal libraries with over 10,000 archival materials from Waley, Goldblatt, as well as German Sinologist Wolfgang Kubin, Poet-translator Wai-lim Yip, and Brian Hilton, among others. Stalling is the founding Director of Mark Allen Everett Poetry Reading Series at and the US-China Poetry Dialog held each year at the University of Oklahoma and Beijing University. Stalling was also the curator of the Poetics of Invention, an exhibition that explores the relationship of English and Chinese phonology through a reimagining of English in China over a 1000-year period.

Editing 
Stalling is a founding Editor of Chinese Literature Today journal now published under a new title Chinese Literature and Thought Today (Routledge) and CLT book series (University of Oklahoma Press) and is a co-editor of The Chinese Written Character as a Medium for Poetry (Fordham), By The River: Contemporary Chinese Novellas (Oklahoma), and Contemporary Taiwanese Women Writers: An Anthology (Cambria).

Research and scholarship 
Stalling is the author of the monograph Poetics of Emptiness: Transformations of Asian Thought in American Poetry (Fordham) and has published various articles and book chapters on topics ranging from transpacific poetry, translation studies, and interlanguage art and poetics. Stalling's interlanguage work is explored in a new artbook edited by Chen Wang and published by the University of Hong Kong Art Museum Press (distributed by the University of Chicago Press, 2022).  This book includes chapters on Stalling's work by the Chinese-English psycholinguist Liu Nian, and Comparative Literature scholar, Timothy Billings.

Translation 
Stalling is the translator of Winter Sun: Poety of Shi Zhi (1966-2005) which was a finalist for the National Translation Award and has published multiple translations of the poet Zheng Xiaoqiong.

Invention 
Stalling is the inventor of the Stalling Chinese Character Phonetic Transcription System (思道林汉字音标) which is available as an iPhone app called Pinying, which won the Outstanding Inventor Award from the Ronnie K Irani Center for the Creation of Economic Wealth in 2016. Stalling also created the English Jueju form of poetry and oversees the English Jueju prize held in conjunction with the Newman Prize for Chinese Literature. Stalling has given two TEDx Talks on interlanguage invention and his work was featured in an exhibition entitled “Poetics of Invention” at the University of Oklahoma Bizzell Memorial Library from 2017 to 2018 and at the University of Missouri Kansas City Library from 2018 to 2019.

References

External links 
New Letters on the Air Interview
How Chinese Characters Can Change English Language Education by Jonathan Stalling
 Sino-English (Pinying) Radio New Zealand interview

1975 births
Living people
Peking University alumni
Chinese–English translators
English–Chinese translators
University at Buffalo alumni
University of Hawaiʻi alumni
University of California, Berkeley alumni
People from Carroll County, Arkansas
University of Oklahoma faculty
Alumni of the University of Edinburgh
21st-century American male writers
21st-century American poets
Academic journal editors
21st-century translators